Richard Bache Ayers (April 28, 1924 – May 4, 2014) was an American comic book artist and cartoonist best known for his work as one of Jack Kirby's inkers during the late-1950s and 1960s period known as the Silver Age of Comics, including on some of the earliest issues of Marvel Comics' The Fantastic Four. He is the signature penciler of Marvel's World War II comic Sgt. Fury and his Howling Commandos, drawing it for a 10-year run, and he co-created Magazine Enterprises' 1950s Western-horror character the Ghost Rider, a version of which he would draw for Marvel in the 1960s.

Ayers was inducted into the Will Eisner Comic Book Hall of Fame in 2007.

Early life
Richard Bache Ayers was born April 28, 1924, in Ossining, New York, the son of John Bache Ayers and Gladys Minnerly Ayers. He had a sister who was 10 years older. The siblings were in the 13th generation, he said, of the Ayers family that had settled in Newbury, Massachusetts in 1635. At 18, during World War II, he enlisted in the United States Army Air Corps, and was stationed in Florida, where after failing radar training he was sent for a month's art training at McTomb University and began working as an artist in the Air Corps' Operations division. He published his first comic strip, Radio Ray, in the military newspaper Radio Post in 1942.

Career
Ayers broke into comics with unpublished work done for Western Publishing's Dell Comics imprint. "I approached them," Ayers said in a 1996 interview. "I had a story written and drawn. They wanted to wrap a book around it.... I got into it, but Dell decided to scrap the project. ... It was an adventure thing, boy and girl; the boy wanted to be a trumpet player. The girl kept feeding the jukebox and he'd played along to Harry James or whatever sort of thing. ... It didn't make it, but it got me started where I wanted to be in the business."

Magazine Enterprises
Following this, in 1947, Ayers studied under Burne Hogarth in the first class of Hogarth's new institution, New York City's Cartoonists and Illustrators School (renamed the School of Visual Arts in 1956). Joe Shuster, co-creator of Superman, would visit the class, and Ayers eventually ventured to his nearby studio. "Next thing I knew," Ayers said in the same interview, "I was penciling a bit here and there." In a 2005 interview, Ayers elaborated that, "Joe had me pencil some of his Funnyman stories after seeing my drawings at Hogarth's evening class" and "sent me to [editor] Vin Sullivan of Magazine Enterprises." There, Sullivan "let me try the Jimmy Durante [humor] strip. I submitted my work and got the job."

Ayers went on to pencil and ink Western stories in the late 1940s for Magazine Enterprises' A-1 Comics and Trail Colt, and for Prize Comics' Prize Comics Western. With writer Ray Krank, Ayers created the horror-themed Western character Ghost Rider in Tim Holt #11 (1949).  The character appeared in stories through the run of Tim Holt, Red Mask, A-1 Comics, Bobby Benson's B-Bar-B Riders, and the 14-issue solo series The Ghost Rider (1950–1954), up through the introduction of the Comics Code. The character's genesis came, Ayers recalled in 2003, when Sullivan "describe[d] what he wanted in the Ghost Rider" and told Ayers to see the 1949 Disney animated feature The Adventures of Ichabod and Mr. Toad, one segment of which adapted Washington Irving's story "The Legend of Sleepy Hollow", featuring the Headless Horseman. "[A]nd then he told me to play the Vaughn Monroe record "(Ghost) Riders in the Sky". And then he started talking about what he wanted the guy wearing."

After the trademark to the character's name and motif lapsed, Marvel Comics debuted its own near-identical, non-horror version of the character in Ghost Rider #1 (Feb. 1967), by writers Roy Thomas and Gary Friedrich and original Ghost Rider artist Ayers.

Ayers' hands appear onscreen as those of a cartoonist played by actor Don Briggs in "The Comic Strip Murders", a 1949 episode of the CBS television series Suspense.

Atlas Comics
In 1952, while continuing to freelance for Magazine Enterprises, Ayers began a long freelance run at Atlas Comics, the 1950s forerunner of Marvel Comics. He drew horror stories in such titles as Adventures into Terror, Astonishing, Journey into Mystery, Journey into Unknown Worlds, Menace, Mystery Tales, Mystic, Strange Tales, and Uncanny Tales. As well, he drew the brief revival of the 1940s Golden Age of Comics superhero the Human Torch, from Marvel's 1940s predecessor Timely Comics, in Young Men # 21-24 (June 1953 - Feb. 1954). An additional, unpublished Human Torch story drawn by Ayers belatedly appeared in Marvel Super-Heroes #16 (Sept. 1968).

During the 1950s, Ayers also drew freelance for Charlton Comics, including for the horror comic The Thing and the satirical series Eh!.

Marvel Comics

Ayers first teamed with the highly influential and historically important penciler Jack Kirby at Atlas shortly before Atlas transitioned to become Marvel Comics. As Kirby's second regular Marvel inker, following Christopher Rule, Ayers would ink countless covers and stories, including on such landmark comics as most early issues of The Fantastic Four, in addition to a slew of Western and "pre-superhero Marvel" monster stories in Amazing Adventures, Journey into Mystery, Strange Tales, Tales of Suspense, and Tales to Astonish. Because creator credits were not routinely given at the time, two standard databases disagree over the duo's first published collaboration. Ayers revealed in 1996, however:

Ayers went on to ink scores of Kirby Western and monster stories, including such much-reprinted tales as "I Created the Colossus!" (Tales of Suspense #14, Feb. 1961), "Goom! The Thing from Planet X!" (Tales of Suspense #15, March 1961), and "Fin Fang Foom!" (Strange Tales #89, Oct. 1961). As Marvel introduced its superheroes in the early 1960s, Ayers inked Kirby on the first appearances of Ant-Man (Tales to Astonish #27 & 35, Jan. & Sept. 1962), Sgt. Fury and his Howling Commandos (issues #1-3, May-Sept. 1963), and the revamped Rawhide Kid (beginning with The Rawhide Kid #17, Aug. 1960); on the second and several subsequent early appearances of Thor (Journey into Mystery #84-89, Sept. 1962 - Feb. 1963); on Fantastic Four #6-20 (Sept. 1962 - Nov. 1963), and the spin-off Human Torch solo series in Strange Tales (starting with its debut in issue #101); and The Incredible Hulk #3-5 (Sept. 1962 - Jan. 1963), among other series.

Additionally, Ayers took over from Kirby as Sgt. Fury penciler with issue #8 (July 1964), beginning a 10-year run that — except for #13 (which he inked over Kirby's pencils), and five issues by other pencilers — continued virtually unbroken through #120 (with the series running Ayers reprints every-other-issue through most but not all from #79 on).

Later career
In the 1980s, Ayers, inked by Chic Stone, drew four editions of the promotional, annual comic-book series initially cover-titled TRS-80 Computer Whiz Kids and, thereafter, Tandy Computer Whiz Kids, published by Archie Comics for Radio Shack: The Computer Trap (March 1984), The Computers That Said No to Drugs (March 1985), The Answer to a Riddle (March 1987), and Fit to Win (March 1988). He also drew approximately 30 sports-star biographies for Revolutionary Comics between 1990 and 1994.

Ayers' work continued into the 2000s. He contributed a pinup page to the 2001 comic The Song of Mykal, published privately by the comics shop Atlantis Fantasyworld, did inking on "Doris Danger" stories in the magazine Tabloia #572-576, and drew a pinup page in the comic Doris Danger's Greatest All-Out Army Battles! 

He wrote and drew the eight-page "Chips Wilde" Western story in the benefit comic Actor Comics Presents #1 (Fall 2006), provided a sketch for the benefit comic The 3-Minute Sketchbook (2007), and contributed to the tribute comic The Uncanny Dave Cockrum (2007). In 2009, he drew a half-page biographical illustration of a 1940s character in the reference guide Marvel Mystery Handbook 70th Anniversary Special.

Personal life
Ayers married Charlotte Lindy Walter on April 7, 1951. The couple had four children: sons Richard, Fred, and Steve, and daughter, Elaine. Ayers died at his home in White Plains, New York on May 4, 2014, six days after his 90th birthday.

Awards and honors

 1967 Alley Award for Best War Title for Sgt. Fury and his Howling Commandoes
 1968 Alley Award for Best War Title for Sgt. Fury and his Howling Commandoes
 1985 National Cartoonists Society Award for Best Comic Book
 2007 inductee, Will Eisner Comic Book Hall of Fame
 2013 Inkwell Awards Joe Sinnott Hall of Fame

References

Further reading
Alter Ego vol.. 3, #31 (Dec. 2003): Interview with Dick Ayers (part 2 of 2)

External links

National Cartoonists Society Awards
Remembering Dick Ayers - Washington Post (Includes Ayers full name)

Audio files
Audio of Merry Marvel Marching Society record, including voice of Dick Ayers, at Dograt.com. WebCitation archive.

1924 births
2014 deaths
People from Ossining, New York
Will Eisner Award Hall of Fame inductees
United States Army Air Forces soldiers
United States Army Air Forces personnel of World War II
Golden Age comics creators
Marvel Comics people
Inkpot Award winners